Royal Hotel is a luxury hotel in Oran, Algeria. One of the most luxurious hotels in Oran, it is set in a colonial building dated to 1920 and contains 112 rooms, 12 junior suites and 5 senior suites.

References

External links
 Website

Hotels in Oran
Hotels in Algeria
Hotel buildings completed in 1920